Notylia bungerothii is a species of orchid that occurs from Venezuela, Guyana and Ecuador.

References

External links 

bungerothii
Orchids of South America
Plants described in 1887